The Kadavu fantail (Rhipidura personata) is a species of bird in the fantail family Rhipiduridae.
It is endemic to Kadavu and Ono in the Kadavu archipelago, in southern Fiji. It is closely related to the streaked fantail of the rest of Fiji, and forms a superspecies with the numerous island species of fantail ranging from the Solomon Islands (the brown fantail) to Samoa (the Samoan fantail).

The Kadavu fantail is restricted to tropical moist lowland forests, where it feeds by flycatching for insects. It sometimes joins mixed-species feeding flocks with Polynesian trillers, Fiji bush warblers and silvereyes. The breeding season is October and November. 
It is threatened by habitat loss.

Taxonomy 

Kadavu fantail (R. personata) forms a superspecies with: 
 Brown fantail (R. drownei)
 Makira fantail (R. tenebrosa)
 Rennell fantail (R. rennelliana)
 Streaked fantail (R. verreauxi)
 Samoan fantail (R. nebulosa)

References

Rhipidura
Endemic birds of Fiji
Birds described in 1876
Taxonomy articles created by Polbot